Robert Norval Garrett (February 15, 1904 – April 20, 1973) was an American college football coach He was the first head football coach at Southeastern Louisiana College—now known as Southeastern Louisiana University—in Hammond, Louisiana and he held that position for the 1930 season. His coaching record at Southeastern Louisiana was 2–4. He died at a hospital in Hammond in 1973.

Head coaching record

References

External links
 

1904 births
1973 deaths
Southeastern Louisiana Lions football coaches
People from Henry County, Indiana